Chloroclystis horistes is a moth in the  family Geometridae. It is found in Nepal.

References

Moths described in 1958
Chloroclystis
Moths of Asia